The NCAA Season 97 women's volleyball tournament started on June 11, 2022 at Paco Arena in Paco, Manila, Philippines. Only the women's tournament was held due to the impact of the COVID-19 pandemic in the Philippines. The men's, boys' and girls' volleyball tournaments were not be held this season due to the pandemic.

Tournament format 
The usual single round elimination will be followed:
 Single round eliminations; top four teams advance to the stepladder 
 Slot1: 4# vs 3# (knockout)
 Slot2: 2# vs Winner of 4# vs 3# (knockout)
 Slot3: 1# vs Winner of 2# vs 3#
 The finals is a best-of-three series.
Or

Semis: No sweep

 Single round eliminations; top four teams advance to the semifinals 

 If two teams are tied,  there will be a playoffs 

 1# vs 4# (1# is twice to beat)
 2# vs 3# (2# is twice to beat)

2. The finals is best of three series

Team line-up 

Source: GMA Network-NCAA Season 97 women's volleyball lineup

Elimination round

Team standings 

Point system:
 3 points = win match in 3 or 4 sets
 2 points = win match in 5 sets
 1 point  = lose match in 5 sets
 0 point  = lose match in 3 or 4 sets

Match-up results

Scores

Bracket

Stepladder semifinals

First round 
This is a one-game playoff.

Second round 
This is a one-game playoff.

Finals 
Benilde will a have best-of-three finals series against the semifinals winner.

CSB wins series 2–0

Finals Most Valuable Player:

Awards 
 Most Valuable Player: 
 Rookie of the Year: 
 1st Best Outside Spiker: 
 2nd Best Outside Spiker: 
 1st Best Middle Blocker: 
 2nd Best Middle Blocker: 
 Best Opposite Spiker:  
 Best Setter:  
 Best Libero: 
 Coach of the Year:

Media
The women's volleyball tournament started on June 11, 2022, with matches airing on GTV.

Play-by-play commentator
Anton Roxas
Martin Javier
Andrei Felix
Mikee Reyes
Martin Antonio
Sophia Senoron

Color commentator
Cesca Racraquin
John Vic De Guzman
Kara Acevedo-Ong
Gyra Barroga
Jayvee Sumagaysay
Anjo Pertierra
Michele Gumabao
Grethcel Soltones
Shola Alvarez
Martin Antonio

Courtside reporter
Baileys Acot
Chase Orozco
Chloe Carillo
Aya De Quiroz
Christian Dimaunahan
Sofia Rodels
Ann Gabriel
Lance Santiago
Eden Hernandez
Christian Sebastian
Chantal Laude
Avia Zunic
Michelle Naldo

See also
UAAP Season 84 volleyball tournaments

References

NCAA (Philippines) volleyball tournaments
2022 in Philippine sport
Volleyball events postponed due to the COVID-19 pandemic